King Lear is a 1999 adaptation of William Shakespeare's play of the same name.  The film stars Brian Blessed (who also co-directed the film, along with Tony Rotherham) in the title role. Apart from  Peter Brook's King Lear in 1971, it is the only other feature-length film adaptation to preserve Shakespeare's verse. Yvonne Griggs, in Shakespeare's King Lear: A close study of the relationship between text and film (2009), characterised it as "a very stilted costume drama".

Cast

See also
 List of historical drama films

References

External links
 

1999 films
British drama films
Films based on King Lear
Films set in England
1990s English-language films
1990s British films